Hartmann Pauly (August 5, 1893 – August 19, 1966) was an American equestrian. He competed in two events at the 1952 Summer Olympics.

References

1893 births
1966 deaths
American male equestrians
American dressage riders
Olympic equestrians of the United States
Equestrians at the 1952 Summer Olympics
Sportspeople from Offenbach am Main